The Return of Don Camillo (Italian: Il ritorno di Don Camillo; French: Le Retour de don Camillo) is a 1953 French-Italian comedy film directed by Julien Duvivier and starring Fernandel, Gino Cervi and Édouard Delmont. The film's sets were designed by Virgilio Marchi. It was the second of five films featuring Fernandel as the Italian priest Don Camillo and his struggles with Giuseppe 'Peppone' Bottazzi, the Communist Mayor of their rural town.

Plot
Don Camillo is exiled to a remote and bleak mountain parish by his bishop at the request of Peppone, the Communist mayor of a small Po Valley town named Brescello. But the mayor develops problems with the citizens of the town, who want Camillo back as parish priest. In addition, a flood threatens to destroy Brescello and its environs. So Peppone calls back the priest, and he tries to raise the money needed to prevent damage from the imminent flood. However, delays occur and the flood devastates the area. Don Camillo insists on remaining in the town as the townspeople flee to safety, but the film ends on a heart-warming note as the sun breaks out heralding the end of the flood.

Cast
 Fernandel as Don Camillo 
 Gino Cervi as Giuseppe 'Peppone' Bottazzi 
 Édouard Delmont as Dr Spiletti 
 Paolo Stoppa as Marchetti  
 Alexandre Rignault as Franceso 'Nero' Gallini  
 Thomy Bourdelle as Cagnola  
 Leda Gloria as Signora Bottazzi  
 Charles Vissières as the Bishop  
 Claudy Chapeland as Beppo Bottazzi 
 Tony Jacquot as Don Pietro  
 Saro Urzì as Brusco the barber
 Manuel Gary
 Lia Di Leo as the schoolmistress 
 Marco Tulli as Lo Smilzo 
 Arturo Bragaglia as the roadworker (who gives Don Camillo a lift on his motorbike)   
 Enzo Staiola as Mario Cagnola 
 Miranda Campa as Signora Spiletti

Reception
It was the second most popular film of the year at the French box office in 1953.

Sequel
Don Camillo's Last Round (Italian: Don Camillo e l'onorevole Peppone; French: La Grande Bagarre) (1955)
Don Camillo: Monsignor (Italian: Don Camillo monsignore ma non troppo; French: Don Camillo Monseigneur) (1961)
Don Camillo in Moscow (Italian: Il compagno don Camillo; French: Don Camillo en Russie) (1965)
Don Camillo e i giovani d'oggi (French: Don Camillo et les contestataires; English translated: Don Camillo and the youth of today)  (1970) (unfinished film)

References

Bibliography 
 Moliterno, Gino. The A to Z of Italian Cinema. Scarecrow Press, 2009.

External links 
 

1953 films
French comedy films
Italian comedy films
1953 comedy films
1950s Italian-language films
Films about Catholic priests
Films based on short fiction
Films based on works by Giovannino Guareschi
Films directed by Julien Duvivier
Films set in Italy
Films shot in Abruzzo
Films with screenplays by René Barjavel
Italian sequel films
French sequel films
French satirical films
Italian satirical films
French political satire films
Italian political satire films
Films critical of communism
Films scored by Alessandro Cicognini
French black-and-white films
Italian black-and-white films
1950s French films
1950s Italian films